Mark G. Ham (1820 – 1869) was an American sailor who received the Medal of Honor for valor in action during the American Civil War.

Biography
Ham was born in Portsmouth, New Hampshire. He was a member of the crew of  when she sank the commerce raider  on June 19, 1864 off Cherbourg, France. During this action, he distinguished himself under heavy fire from the enemy.

Ham is buried in Harmony Grove Cemetery in Portsmouth, New Hampshire.

Medal of Honor citation
Rank and Organization: Carpenter's Mate, U.S. Navy. Born: 1820, Portsmouth, N.H. Accredited To: New Hampshire. G.O. No.: 45, December 31, 1864.

Citation:

Served on board the U.S.S. Kearsarge when she destroyed the Alabama off Cherbourg, France, June 19, 1864. Performing his duties intelligently and faithfully, Ham distinguished himself in the face of the bitter enemy fire and was highly commended by his divisional officer.

See also

CSS Alabama
Cherbourg
List of Medal of Honor recipients
List of American Civil War Medal of Honor recipients: G–L

Notes

References

External links 
Kearsarge and Alabama: The Civil War’s Classic Ship-to-Ship Duel

1820 births
1869 deaths
Union Navy sailors
United States Navy Medal of Honor recipients
People of New Hampshire in the American Civil War
American Civil War recipients of the Medal of Honor
Burials in New Hampshire